René Martial (17 October 1873 in Paris – 23 January 1955 in Vendôme) was a French anthropologist during the thirties and the Vichy era (1940–1944).

Life 
Dr. René Martial appears in books on the history of Vichy or of anti-Semitism as an example of « French-style racism ». The social trajectory of this character disappears behind the excessive visibility of his collaboration and his works. Yet, before being a « racist », R. Martial was a hygienist who claimed to be a socialist. According to  William H. Schneider « the views on immigration stated by French politician Jean-Marie Le Pen fit well with Martial's earlier ideas »

Selected works
 Traits de l'immigration et de la greffe inter-raciale,  Larose, 1931, rewarded by the Institut de France
 La Race française, Mercure de France, 1934, réédité en 1943,  rewarded by the Institut de France
 Race, hérédité, folie. Etude d’anthropo-sociologie appliquée à l’immigration, Paris, Mercure de France, 1938
 Vie et constance des races, Mercure de France, 1939.
 Français qui es-tu ? Mercure de France, 1942
 Les Métis - Nouvelle étude sur les migrations, le mélange des races, le métissage, la retrempe de la race française et la révision du code de la famille, Flammarion, 1942
 Notre race et ses aïeux,  Perqual, 1943
 Les races humaines, Hachette, 1955

References
 William H. Schneider, Quality and Quantity. The Quest for Biological Regeneration in Twentieth-Century France, Cambridge University Press, 1990, pp. 231–250

1873 births
1955 deaths
Scientists from Paris
French anthropologists